Cocoa is a city in Brevard County, Florida. The population was 19,041 at the 2020 United States Census. It is part of the Palm Bay–Melbourne–Titusville Metropolitan Statistical Area.

History

Etymology
Several stories circulate among Cocoa old timers as to how the town got its name. One story says that the mail used to come by river boat and was placed in an empty tin box labeled Baker's Cocoa. The box was nailed to a piling in the river next to downtown. Additionally, an early hotel in the area, located on the Indian River lagoon, was named Cocoa House. Another story speaks of an elderly African American woman who lived on the banks of the Indian River. She would supply hot cocoa to sailors traversing the Indian River. It was said, the sailors approaching her house would yell out "Cocoa! Cocoa!" alerting the woman that they were present and wanted the beverage.

19th Century
In 1885, the S. F. Travis Hardware store opened. As of 2023, the business remains open. Cocoa's business district was mostly destroyed by fire in 1890. But soon, significant development was stimulated by the extension of the Jacksonville, St. Augustine, and Indian River Railway to Cocoa.

The city was chartered on October 1, 1895. In the winter of 1894–1895, Cocoa had an economic setback when the "Great Freeze" destroyed the citrus crop and forced many citrus workers to seek new jobs. By 1903, the population of Cocoa had declined to 382.

Early 20th Century
In the 1910s, population growth in Cocoa accelerated. The state business directory of 1911–1912 stated the population was 550.

In October 1918, the mayor of Cocoa proclaimed that all places of assembly, including schools, churches, and movies be closed to avoid spreading the Spanish flu.

By 1925, the population was estimated at 1,800. By 1930, despite the Great Depression, the population had risen to 2,200.

World War II and beyond
The population rose dramatically following the development of the space industry, quadrupling from 3,098 in 1940 to 12,244 in 1960. Cocoa and the surrounding area also became integrated with the tourist industry for the first time, as thousands visited the area to witness the launches from Cape Canaveral. By 1980, the population had grown to 16,096.

Education was segregated until the 1960s, at which time Monroe High School and elementary schools for black students were closed.

In 1964, the Cocoa Expo Sports Center (Cocoa Stadium) was built for the Colt 45s spring baseball training and Grapefruit League games. The team later became the Houston Astros. In the early 1980s, the city attempted to upgrade the stadium by asking the Astros to pay for needed repairs. In 1985, the team responded by moving its training to Osceola County Stadium in Kissimmee. As a result, it was decided that future negotiations with major league teams would be done by the county government.

Clearlake Middle School was closed in 2013. Students were moved to Cocoa High School, which was converted to a junior and senior high school.

Government
Cocoa first approved the Council-Manager form of government in 1959, and subsequent changes to the state statutes mirrored the City of Cocoa's Council-Manager Plan. The City Council serves as the Board of Directors for the City, with the Mayor as Chairman. The City Manager serves as the Chief Executive. The City Council for the City of Cocoa is made up of five members; the Mayor is elected at large and the four council members are elected by each of their districts.

 Mayor – Michael C. Blake
 Councilman, District 1 – Alex Goins
 Councilman, District 2 – Lavander Hearn
 Councilman, District 3 – Rip Dyal
 Councilwoman, District 4 – Lorraine Koss
 City Manager (appointed) – Stockton Whitten

In 2007, the city had a taxable real estate base of $1.18 billion.

Cocoa has its own police and fire department. The Cocoa Police Department is the primary law enforcement agency within the city. It is aided by the Brevard County Sheriff's Office, for court and civil process. The Cocoa Fire Department has three stations. Brevard County Fire Rescue also has a station within the city limits.

In 2021, the city had an authorized police force of 72 police officers and 44 firefighters.

Geography

Fauna
The Cocoa Bird Count has annually counted species of birds in or near Cocoa since 1950. In 2010, it counted 150 species. There was an annual "Christmas Bird Count" before this, starting in 1900.

Climate

Demographics

As of the census of 2000, there were 16,412 people, 6,939 households, and 4,232 families residing in the city. The population density was 2,200.3 inhabitants per square mile (849.4/km2). The racial makeup of the city was 62.47% White, 32.28% African American, 0.63% Native American, 0.94% Asian, 0.23% Pacific Islander, 1.58% from other races, and 1.87% from two or more races. Hispanic or Latino of any race were 4.93% of the population.

There were 6,939 households, out of which 28.4% had children under the age of 18 living with them, 37.0% were married couples living together, 19.2% had a female householder with no husband present, and 39.0% were non-families. 32.0% of all households were made up of individuals, and 11.5% had someone living alone who was 65 years of age or older. The average household size was 2.35 and the average family size was 2.97.

In the city, the population was distributed as follows: 26.4% under the age of 18, 8.6% from 18 to 24, 29.1% from 25 to 44, 21.6% from 45 to 64, and 14.3% who were 65 years of age or older. The median age was 36 years. For every 100 females, there were 90.5 males. For every 100 females age 18 and over, there were 86.4 males.

Economy

Personal income
According to 2020 United States Census data:
 Median household income = $45,011
 Per capita income = $26,831
 Below the poverty line:
 Population = 13.0%

Industry
Construction and retail trade are the two largest industries by employment in Cocoa as of 2017. In 2008, Kel-Tec CNC Industries, located in Cocoa, was the third-largest manufacturer of pistols in the United States. Cocoa has 1,381 registered businesses that include light manufacturing and industrial, retail and office businesses as of 2017. Cocoa hosts one of the facilities building SpaceX Starship.

Workforce
In 2017, 9,633 persons were employed, with 84% having a high school education or higher.

Tourism

Tourism is high in the downtown historic business district. Cruise passenger tourists come from Port Canaveral on excursions or day trips. In addition, tourists are attracted to the historic sites and local attractions such as the Brevard Museum of History & Natural Science, the Eastern Florida State College Planetarium and Observatory, Historic Cocoa Village, Indian River Queen (excursion boat), Indian River Drive scenic by-pass, the Aladdin Theater, Historic Porcher House, and Riverfront Park. Historic Cocoa Village has shopping and two Golden Spoon award-winning restaurants, and boutiques. The city sponsors more than 50 special events each year.

Cocoa Village

The historic downtown area is called Cocoa Village, situated along Florida Avenue to Stone Street, and stretching to Riverfront Park along the Indian River. It has shops and restaurants, and is surrounded by historic buildings and the Cocoa Riverfront Park. The Florida Historical Society is headquartered in the historic Cocoa Post Office, originally built in 1939 by the Works Progress Administration. The area was revitalized by funding for public infrastructure through the Cocoa Redevelopment Agency, City and private investment. Cocoa Village is also home to the Historic Cocoa Village Playhouse which was originally called, The Aladdin Theatre.

Education
The city area has the following educational institutions:

Higher education:
 Eastern Florida State College, Cocoa Campus
 University of Central Florida, Cocoa Campus

Public school system:
 Cambridge Elementary School
 Cocoa High School
 Endeavor Elementary Magnet School
 Saturn Elementary School

Private schools:
 Emma Jewel Charter Academy
 St. Marks Episcopal Academy

Infrastructure

Transportation

Major roads
All are at least four-lane roads, unless otherwise designated.
  – This is the main north-south route through the city, known officially as Cocoa Boulevard. From north to south, the road enters Cocoa via the census-designated place Sharpes. The road follows a vaguely northwest-southeast course as it passes through Cocoa Village. Major intersections include SR 528 (diamond interchange), Michigan Avenue, CR 503, and SR 520. 
  – There are three interchanges within city limits: SR 520 (exit 201), SR 524 (exit 202), and SR 528 (exit 205).
  – This is the secondary north-south road in Cocoa, known locally as Clearlake Road. It runs from SR 524 to SR 520. Major intersections include SR 524, Michigan Avenue, CR 503, Lake Drive, and SR 520.
  – This is a minor county road, known locally as Dixon Boulevard, running from SR 501 to US 1. Major intersections include SR 501, Fiske Boulevard and US 1.
  – This scenic two-lane county road, known locally as, from north to south, Indian River Drive, Brevard Drive/Delannoy Avenue (south/north), and Rockledge Drive, is a slow residential route running directly parallel to the Indian River. Major intersections include Dixon Boulevard and SR 520 (northbound shares a brief concurrency). 
  – This is the main east-west route through the city; 25,000 vehicles/day drive through Cocoa Village. Starting from the west, the road enters the city limits of Cocoa from unincorporated Brevard County and takes on the name King Street. It then intersects SR 524. Following a brief interruption from Cocoa West, the road then runs through Cocoa Village on a pair of one-way streets, eastbound named King Street and westbound named Willard Street, and onto the Merritt Island Causeway. Major intersections include SR 524, I-95 (diamond interchange), SR 501, SR 519, US 1, and Indian River Drive.
  – This is a rural, sometimes two-lane, secondary road running from SR 520 to SR 528. It has no local name. Major intersections include SR 520, I-95, SR 501, and SR 528.
  – This is an east-west highway running from unincorporated areas of the county to the census-designated and unincorporated place of Merritt Island. Major intersections include I-95, SR 524, and US 1.

Rail
The Florida East Coast Railway runs through Cocoa. Into the early 1960s, passengers could take one of two Chicago-bound trains (on alternating days), the City of Miami or the South Wind (both via Birmingham) and the New York-bound East Coast Champion, Havana Special, and Miamian from the Florida East Coast Railway's Cocoa-Rockledge station. Into the latter 1950s, passengers could take the Dixie Flagler to Chicago via Atlanta from the station. All passenger trains along the FEC were suspended in 1963 due to a strike. The FEC resumed local passenger service between Jacksonville and the Miami area from 1965 until July 31, 1968.

A planned Brightline higher speed rail expansion is designed to connect Orlando to Miami making a turn in Cocoa (designated the "Cocoa Curve"), using the Florida East Coast Railway right-of-way south of Cocoa.

Bus
Space Coast Area Transit operates a public bus service in Cocoa and vicinity.

Water

Since 1957, Cocoa has supplied the communities of central Brevard County with potable water.  Cocoa made major investments in the water supply and treatment facilities needed to produce a sub-regional water system.

Cocoa's water system includes the wellfield and raw water collection system, Wewahootee Water Treatment Plant, transmission mains, and the Dyal Water Treatment Plant (WTP).  Cocoa's drinking water sources include the Floridian Aquifer, Intermediate Aquifer, Taylor Creek Reservoir, and Aquifer Storage and Recovery (ASR) wells.  All of these facilities are located in east Orange County.  A distribution system and storage pumping facilities are located in Brevard County.

The Dyal WTP processes about nine billion gallons per year, with peak flows reaching 38 million gallons per day (mgd) during the summer.  Daily flows average 25 mgd.  The Dyal WTP is unusual for Central Florida because it is capable of treating both ground and surface water.

The flag was originally painted on the water tower free of charge by a Greek immigrant. He wanted to decorate the tower in time for the United States Bicentennial celebration in 1976.  In 2014, the City re-furbished and re-painted the tower with the iconic American flags.

Media

Radio stations
 WMMV 1350 AM
 WWBC 1510 AM
 WMIE-FM 91.5
 WQCP 93.9 FM
 WRRQ-LP 96.9 FM

Television station
WUCF-TV 68, a PBS member station operated by a consortium of the University of Central Florida and Eastern Florida State College.

Points of interest
 Florida Solar Energy Center
 Brevard Museum of History & Natural Science
 Alma Clyde Field Library of Florida History

Historic sites
 Community Woman's Club
 Aladdin Theater
 Historic Derby Street Chapel
 Porcher House
 St. Mark's Episcopal Church

Athletics
The Houston Astros held spring training in Cocoa from 1964 through 1984, and the Florida Marlins trained in Cocoa in 1993. Cocoa Stadium was also the long-time home of the Florida State League Cocoa Astros.

In 2009, the Space Coast Surge, a member of the Florida Winter Baseball League, had Cocoa Stadium as its home stadium. The league suspended operations in November 2009.

Cocoa High School has numerous state champion athletic teams.  In 2015, the Cocoa High School football team was ranked 13th in the State of Florida and 1st in the county and had a 35-game winning streak against other Brevard County schools.

Notable people

 Emory L. Bennett (1929–1951), United States Army soldier during the Korean War and Medal of Honor recipient. A statue of him is in Cocoa Riverfront Park
 Tarean Folston (born 1995), football player at the University of Notre Dame
 Chauncey "C.J." Gardner-Johnson (born 1997), American football player
 Jumaine Jones (born 1979), professional basketball player 
 Chip Skowron (c. 1968), hedge fund portfolio manager, convicted of insider trading
 Abbie Sweetwine (1921–2009), African-American nurse who was called "The Angel of Platform 6"  for her work during the Harrow and Wealdstone rail crash
 Scott Thompson (aka; Carrot Top) (born 1965), a 1983 Cocoa High School graduate, is an American stand-up comedian and actor

Sister city
  Beit Shemesh, State of Israel. On October 7, 2007, the city became a sister city with Beit Shemesh. Eastern Florida State College announced that it would participate by exchanging students.

See also
Cocoa Police Department

References

External links

 
 Historic Cocoa Village Association

 
1860 establishments in Florida
Cities in Brevard County, Florida
Cities in Florida
Populated places established in 1860
Populated places on the Intracoastal Waterway in Florida